The International Congress Calendar is a calendar of events organized by non-profit international organizations, mainly those organizations which are included in the Yearbook of International Organizations. It has been published since 1960 by the Union of International Associations (UIA) and includes over 425,000 meetings. Over 15,000 new meetings are included every year.

It is one of the most comprehensive sources of information on future international meetings organized or sponsored by international organizations. All information is provided, or confirmed, by the organizations themselves.

The Calendar is published in print and online.

References
 International Congress Calendar (official page)

See also
Yearbook of International Organizations
Union of International Associations
Encyclopedia of World Problems and Human Potential
Anthony Judge

Calendars